Vandalia is an unincorporated community in Lafayette Township, Owen County, in the U.S. state of Indiana.

History
Vandalia was laid out in 1839. A post office was established at Vandalia in 1846, and remained in operation until it was discontinued in 1927. Two remaining landmarks and reminders of Vandalia's past are the historic chapel (built in 1895) and one-room schoolhouse (building completed in 1868), preserved and maintained by the Vandalia Community Preservation Association.

Geography
It lies at the east end of State Road 246 where it intersects State Road 46. The main village originated near coordinates 39.3137257,-86.8679851.

References

External links
 Vandalia Community Preservation Association

Unincorporated communities in Indiana
Unincorporated communities in Owen County, Indiana